Acetoxymethylketobemidone (O-AMKD), is an opioid designer drug related to ketobemidone, with around the same potency as morphine. It was first identified in Germany in October 2020.

See also 
 2F-Viminol
 3-HO-PCP
 4-Fluoropethidine
 Acetoxyketobemidone
 Bucinnazine
 Dipyanone
 Etodesnitazene
 Methylketobemidone
 Nortilidine
 O-Desmethyltramadol
 Piperidylthiambutene
 Propylketobemidone

References 

Synthetic opioids
4-Phenylpiperidines
Mu-opioid receptor agonists